A Moon landing is the arrival of a spacecraft on the surface of the Moon. 

Moon Landing may also refer to:
 "Moon Landing" (Modern Family), an episode of Modern Family
 Moon Landing (music drama), a 2007 music drama by Stephen Edwards
 Moon Landing (album), a 2013 album by James Blunt
 Moon Landing, a 2009 album by Sivert Høyem
 Moon landing conspiracy theories, claims that some or all elements of the Apollo Project and the associated Moon landings were falsifications staged by NASA and others